is a Japanese footballer who plays for Gamba Osaka in the J1 League. His regular playing position is a left back.

Career
Ahead of his senior year at Kansai University, Kurokawa signed on as a specially designated player for Gamba Osaka ahead of the 2019 season.  He made his first 2 appearances for the men in blue and black in the 2019 J.League Cup, first in the 4-1 victory over Júbilo Iwata on April 24 and later in a 3-1 win over Shimizu S-Pulse the following month.   He made his J.League debut shortly after, coming on as a 71st minute substitute for Oh Jae-suk in the 3-1 loss away to Sagan Tosu on 11 May 2019.

Career statistics
Last update: 5 July 2022

References

External links

1997 births
Living people
Kansai University alumni
Association football people from Hyōgo Prefecture
Japanese footballers
J1 League players
Gamba Osaka players
Association football defenders